
Gmina Nowe Miasto nad Pilicą is an urban-rural gmina (administrative district) in Grójec County, Masovian Voivodeship, in east-central Poland.

Villages
Apart from the town of Nowe Miasto nad Pilicą, Gmina Nowe Miasto nad Pilicą contains the villages and settlements of Bełek, Bieliny, Borowina, Dąbrowa, Domaniewice, Gilówka, Godzimierz, Gostomia, Jankowice, Józefów, Łęgonice, Nowe Bieliny, Nowe Łęgonice, Nowe Strzałki, Pobiedna, Promnik, Prosna, Rokitnica, Rosocha, Rudki, Sacin, Sańbórz, Strzałki, Świdrygały, Wał, Waliska, Wierzchy, Wola Pobiedzińska, Wólka Ligęzowska, Wólka Magierowa, Zalesie, Żdżarki and Żdżary.

Neighbouring gminas
Gmina Nowe Miasto nad Pilicą is bordered by the gminas of Cielądz, Klwów, Mogielnica, Odrzywół, Rzeczyca, Sadkowice and Wyśmierzyce.

References
Polish official population figures 2006

Nowe Miasto nad Pilica
Grójec County